The 1980 United States presidential election in New York took place on November 4, 1980. All 50 states and The District of Columbia, were part of the 1980 United States presidential election. Voters chose 41 electors to the Electoral College, which voted for President and Vice President.

New York was won by former California Governor Ronald Reagan, in a narrow victory against President of the United States Jimmy Carter, who failed to gain reelection against Reagan. Also in the running was Independent candidate Congressman John B. Anderson of Illinois, who ran in New York as the Liberal Party candidate.

Reagan won the state with a plurality of 46.66% of the vote to Carter's 43.99%, a margin of 2.67%. Anderson finished in third, with 7.54%. New York's election results reflect the Republican Party's re-consolidation of base under what is popularly called the "Reagan Revolution," which sounded various overwhelming conservative electoral victories across the United States throughout the 1980s – and most evidently against the relatively unpopular President Carter during the 1980 presidential election. New York weighed in for this election as more Democratic than the national average by about 7%.

This election is notable in that while the highly populated regions of New York City, Buffalo and Albany turned out for Carter, and the sparsely populated upstate counties turned out for Reagan, the election in the state was tipped by the downstate suburban counties around NYC, which were won by Reagan. Most notably, Reagan won in the Long Island suburban counties of Nassau and Suffolk by bigger vote number margins than in all of the counties that Carter won in the state except Manhattan. Carter actually picked up plurality wins in two counties where he had lost in 1976 to Gerald Ford: namely Monroe County, home to the city of Rochester (thereby making Reagan the first-ever Republican to win the White House without carrying this county), and Niagara County. Despite these two county gains by Carter, it wasn't enough for him to retain the state that he had won four years earlier, as Carter's winning margin in New York City was considerably lower than what it had been in 1976. This fact, combined with the big vote number margins that Reagan won by in the densely populated downstate counties outside New York City, enabled Reagan to overtake Carter in the popular vote statewide.

Another major contributing factor to Reagan's victory over Carter was the relatively strong third party showing by independent candidate John B. Anderson, a former liberal Republican congressman who garnered 7.54% of the vote in the State – nearly twice the 4% margin by which Carter had won New York in 1976. Running on the ballot line of New York's Liberal Party, Anderson attracted the votes of many liberals and moderates who normally leaned Democratic but were dissatisfied with the policies of the Carter Administration, and with Rockefeller Republicans who viewed Reagan as too far to the right, thus splitting the left-leaning vote in New York State.

In the heavily populated, and very liberal, five boroughs of New York City, Carter still won overall, and Reagan made only modest gains in vote share over Gerald Ford's 1976 showing of 33%, with Reagan taking 37% in NYC in 1980. While Carter still won in 4 of the 5 boroughs, Carter bled considerable support in New York City to Anderson, with Carter's NYC vote percentage dropping from 66% in 1976 to only 55% in 1980. Since Democratic victories in New York State in that era depended on running up massive margins in New York City to overcome the rest of the state's Republican lean, the reduced vote number margin in New York City from vote-splitting would prove fatal to Carter's chances in 1980. While Reagan only bled about 1% off Republican base support in the state (winning a plurality in a 3-way-race with 46.66% while Gerald Ford had lost the state in a two-man race with 47.52% in 1976), Carter bled 8% off his 1976 support, falling from a 51.95% majority win in 1976 to a losing 43.99% in 1980, with most of these lost Democratic base votes going to Anderson instead.

1980 remains the last election in which a Republican presidential nominee has won traditionally rock-ribbed GOP Tompkins County in upstate New York, home to the college town of Ithaca, where Cornell University and Ithaca College are located. From the Republican Party's founding in 1854 all the way up to 1976, Tompkins County had been a Republican stronghold in presidential elections and had only gone Democratic in the landslides of 1912 and 1964, with Franklin D. Roosevelt never topping 40% in the county in a presidential election. With the Republican Party nationally being increasingly taken over by its conservative wing, the GOP's fortunes quickly began to fade in the county in the 1980s. Reagan narrowly won Tompkins County in 1980 with a plurality of 42% to Carter's 40%, while Anderson took nearly 14%, making it Anderson's strongest county in the state. Four years later in 1984, Tompkins County would vote against Reagan, and by 2004 had become the most Democratic county in all of upstate New York in giving 64.19% of the vote to John Kerry. Tompkins County later gave Barack Obama 70.09% of the vote in 2008, and Joe Biden 73.51% of the vote in 2020.

1980 remains the last election where any presidential candidate would get at least 40 electoral votes from New York.  After the 1980 Census, the state's electoral votes would drop from 41 electoral votes to 36 votes.

Primaries

 Note: The Republican Primary was not decided by votes for each candidate, but for their delegate slates in each and every congressional district.

Results

Results by county

References

New York
1980
1980 New York (state) elections